Víctor Olea Alegría (born 17 June 1950) was a member (militante) of Chile's Partido Socialista.

Olea lived in Santiago, Chile. He was detained by “security agents” on 11 September 1974, and became one of the "detenidos desaparecidos". Manuel Contreras was convicted in 2002 for his abduction.

See also 
Operation Condor

External links
Entry in a human rights website 

1950 births
Enforced disappearances in Chile
People killed in Operation Condor
Socialist Party of Chile politicians
Year of death unknown